Erwin G. "Bud" Tamms was a former member of the Wisconsin State Assembly.

Biography
Tamms was born on January 4, 1931, in Milwaukee, Wisconsin. He attended Washington High School and the University of Wisconsin–Milwaukee. A Lutheran, Tamms served as a Sunday school teacher. He was married with three children. He started Tamms Lithography in 1968. Tamms died on October 21, 2011.

Career
Tamms was elected to the Assembly in 1968. He is a Republican.

References

Politicians from Milwaukee
Businesspeople from Milwaukee
Republican Party members of the Wisconsin State Assembly
University of Wisconsin–Milwaukee alumni
1931 births
2011 deaths
20th-century American businesspeople